Dhamma Dewi may refer to::
 Atula Maha Dhamma Dewi of Pinya, Chief queen consort of Pinya (r. 1325–1340)
 Ameitta Thiri Maha Dhamma Dewi, Queen consort of Thihathura of Ava (r. 1468–1480)
 Atula Thiri Dhamma Dewi of Ava, Queen consort of Ava (r. 1480–1501)
 Dhamma Dewi of Pakhan, Queen consort of Ava (r. 1502–1527)
 Dhamma Dewi of Toungoo, Queen consort of Burma (r. 1530–1550)